Probable E3 ubiquitin-protein ligase HERC1 is an enzyme that in humans is encoded by the HERC1 gene.

The protein encoded by this gene stimulates guanine nucleotide exchange on ARF1 and Rab proteins. This protein is thought to be involved in membrane transport processes

Knowledge of the gene is facilitated by the discovery of a mouse mutation. The tambaleante (tbl) mutation arose spontaneously on the DW/J-Pas genetic background, a recessive mutation of the Herc1 gene located on mouse chromosome 9 that increases Herc1 protein levels. This protein is largely expressed in many tissues (Sanchez-Tena et al., 2016; https://www.proteinatlas.org/ENSG00000103657-HERC1/tissue) and multiple brain regions including the cerebellum (https://www.proteinatlas.org/ENSG00000103657-HERC1/brain). 

Herc1-tbl (tambaleante) mutant mice are characterized by Purkinje cell loss. In addition to the cerebellum, Herc1tbl mutants had lower dendritic spine widths in CA1 pyramidal neurons. Herc1-tbl mutant mice are also characterized by cerebellar ataxia, an unstable gait, and a limb-flexion reflex triggered by tail lifting seen in other cerebellar mutants, the reverse of the normal limb extensor reflex.

Relative to wild-type mice, Herc1-tbl mutant mice fell sooner and more often from a rotarod, fell sooner from a vertical pole, slipped more often and took more time to reach the end of a stationary beam</ref>, and had weaker forelimb grip strength measured by a grip strength meter. The rotarod deficit was rescued when Herc1tbl mutants were bred with transgenic mice expressing normal human HERC1. Herc1tbl mutants were also less adept at landing correctly on all four legs when released in the air.

Biallelic HERC1 mutations were reported in two siblings with facial dysmorphism, macrocephaly, motor development delay, ataxic gait, hypotonia, and intellectual disability. Likewise, a nonsense HERC1 variant was reported in one subject with an autosomal recessive condition consisting of facial dysmorphism, macrocephaly, epilepsy, motor development delay, cerebellar atrophy, and intellectual disability. Facial dysmorphism, macrocephaly, and intellectual disability but without cerebellar ataxia were also reported in two siblings with a HERC1 splice variant mutation. The lack of cerebellar involvement was ascribed either to the nature of the mutation or the influence of modifier genes. Another patient with a frameshift HERC1 mutation predicted to truncate the protein displayed facial dysmorphism, macrocephaly, epileptiform discharges, hypotonia, intellectual disability, and autistic features.

Notes

References

Further reading